The 2007 Tour de Hongrie was the 34th edition of the Tour de Hongrie cycle race and was held from 24 to 28 July 2007. The race started in Gyömrő and finished in Miskolc. The race was won by Andrew Bradley.

General classification

References

2007
2007 in road cycling
2007 in Hungarian sport